Meru is a locality southeast of Geraldton, Western Australia. Its local government area is the City of Greater Geraldton.

The locality was gazetted in 1985.

References

Suburbs of Geraldton